Balls and My Word is a compilation album by American rapper Scarface. The album was released on April 8, 2003, through Rap-A-Lot Records. Rap-A-Lot CEO, James Prince organized a studio album of unreleased songs recorded by Scarface that were outtakes from previous albums. The album failed to match the success of Scarface's previous album, becoming only a minor success, having peaked at 20 on the Billboard 200.

Track listing

Chart positions

Weekly charts

Year-end charts

References

2003 albums
Scarface (rapper) albums
Rap-A-Lot Records albums
Albums produced by N.O. Joe